In architecture, batter is a receding slope of a wall, structure, or earthwork. A wall sloping in the opposite direction is said to overhang.  When used in fortifications it may be called a talus.

The term is used with buildings and non-building structures to identify when a wall or element is intentionally built with an inward slope. A battered corner is an architectural feature using batters. A batter is sometimes used in foundations, retaining walls, dry stone walls, dams, lighthouses, and fortifications.  Other terms that may be used to describe battered walls are "tapered" and "flared". Typically in a battered wall, the taper provides a wide base to carry the weight of the wall above, with the top gradually resulting in the thinnest part as to ease the weight of wall below. The batter angle is typically described as a ratio of the offset and height or a degree angle that is dependent on the building materials and application. For example, typical dry-stone construction of retaining walls utilizes a 1:6 ratio, that is for every 1 inch that the wall steps back, it increases 6 inches in height.

Historical uses 

Walls may be battered to provide structural strength or for decorative reasons. In military architecture, they made walls harder to undermine or tunnel, and provided some defense against artillery, especially early siege engine projectiles and cannon, where the energy of the projectile might be largely deflected, on the same principle as modern sloped armor. Siege towers could not be pushed next to the top of a strongly battered wall.  Types of fortification using batters included the talus and glacis.

Regional examples

Asia 
Architectural styles that often include battered walls as a stylistic feature include Indo-Islamic architecture, where it was used in many tombs and some mosques, as well as many forts in India. Tughlaqabad Fort in Delhi is a good example, built by Ghiyath al-Din Tughluq, whose tomb opposite the fort (illustrated above) also has a strong batter. In Hindu temple architecture, the walls of the large Gopurams of South India are usually battered, often with a slight concave curve.

In the Himalayan region, battered walls are one of the typifying characteristics of traditional Tibetan architecture. With minimal foreign influence over the centuries, the region's use of battered walls are considered to be an indigenous creation and part of Tibet's vernacular architecture. This style of batter wall architecture was the preferred style of construction for much of Inner-Asia, and has been used from Nepal to Siberia. The 13-story Potala Palace in Lhasa, is one of the best known examples of this style and was named a UNESCO World Heritage Site in 1994.

Middle East
Battered walls are a common architectural feature found in Ancient Egyptian architecture. Usually constructed from mud brick for residential applications, limestone, sandstone, or granite was used mainly in the construction of temples and tombs. In terms of monumental architecture, the Giza pyramid complex in Cairo utilized different grades of battered walls to achieve great heights with relative stability. The Pyramid of Djoser is an archeological remain in the Saqqara necropolis, northwest of the city of Memphis that is a quintessential example of battered walls used in sequence to produce a step pyramid.

New World
In the Americas, battered walls are seen as a fairly common aspect of Mission style architecture, where Spanish design was hybridized with Native American adobe building techniques. As exemplified by the San Estevan del Rey Mission Church in Acoma, New Mexico, c.1629-42, the heights desired by Spanish Catholic Mission design was achieved through battering adobe bricks to achieve structural stability.

Gallery

References

Building engineering
Types of wall
Architectural terminology